Brattström is a surname. Notable people with the surname include:

Ebba Witt-Brattström (born 1953), Swedish scholar in comparative literature
Inger Brattström (1920–2018), Swedish writer
Victor Brattström (born 1997), Swedish ice hockey player

Swedish-language surnames